Six ships and a shore establishment of the Royal Navy have been named HMS Hannibal after the Carthaginian leader Hannibal:
  was a 50-gun fourth rate launched in 1779 and captured by the French in 1782.
  was a 14-gun sloop purchased in 1782, and foundered in 1788.
  was a 74-gun third rate launched in 1786 and captured by the French during the first part of the Battle of Algeciras Bay on 5 July 1801.
  was a 74-gun third rate launched in 1810.  She was on harbour service from 1825 and was broken up in 1833.
 HMS Hannibal was to have been a 90-gun second rate. She was ordered in 1840, but was cancelled and reordered as the next . 
  was a 91-gun screw propelled second rate launched in 1854. She was hulked in 1874 and was sold in 1904.
  was a  launched in 1896. She served as a troopship during the First World War and was sold in 1920.

Shore establishment
  was a naval base, commissioned at Algiers in 1943 and paid off in 1945. It was recommissioned in 1945 and paid off in 1946.

Hired armed vessel
  was a ship of about 16 guns that the Royal Navy hired in 1804 and lost on 16 November of that same year near Sandown, Isle of Wight.

See also
 
 

Royal Navy ship names